Sarcodon bubalinus is a European species of tooth fungus in the family Bankeraceae. First described by Christian Hendrik Persoon in 1825 as Hydnum bubalinum, it was transferred to the genus Sarcodon by Rudolph Arnold Maas Geesteranus in 1956.

References

External links

Fungi described in 1825
Fungi of Europe
bubalinus
Taxa named by Christiaan Hendrik Persoon